Samuel Carlisle Martin (1867–1932) was an American newspaper cartoonist and illustrator.

Martin was born in St. Louis on November 13, 1867, to John and Hattie Martin; John Martin was railroad agent. Martin had a twin brother (who also became a newspaper illustrator) and other siblings. He attended the St. Louis School of Fine Arts at Washington University.

Martin was an illustrator for the St. Louis Post-Dispatch and was the third cartoonist to draw that paper's Weatherbird, taking over from Oscar Chopin. He drew the strip (which continues to this day) from 1910 to 1932. Martin began the practice of having the Weatherbird comment on current events, and set the standards of six words maximum for the "birdline" (the Weatherbird's comments).

Assisted by reporter Carlos Hurd (who helped write the birdlines), Martin drew the Weatherbird until his death. He was succeeded by Amadee Wohlschlaeger (then just out of his teens), who went on to draw the strip for a half century.

Personal life and death
Martin married Lynn Shackleford on October 30, 1897. They had a son, Samuel Jr., and a daughter. Martin died on August 17, 1932, in St. Louis.

References

1867 births
1932 deaths
St. Louis Post-Dispatch people
American comic strip cartoonists
Sam Fox School of Design & Visual Arts alumni
People from St. Louis